R66 may refer to:
 R66 (South Africa), a road
 HD 268835, a star
 , a destroyer of the Royal Navy
 R66: Repeated exposure may cause skin dryness or cracking, a risk phrase
 R66 Protocol, a file transfer protocol
 Robinson R66, a helicopter
 Small nucleolar RNA R66